Vema is a genus of deep-sea molluscs, monoplacophorans. The genus is named after the oceanographic Research Vessel Vema.

All Vema species have six pairs of gills.

Species
 Vema bacescui (Menzies, 1968)
 Vema ewingi (Clarke & Menzies, 1959)
 Vema levinae Warén, 1996
 Vema occidua B. A. Marshall, 2006

References

Monoplacophora
Mollusc genera